Mairéad Carlin is an Irish singer. She is a former member of the ensemble Celtic Woman and was the first-ever member of the group that was born in Northern Ireland.

Early life
Carlin was born in Derry. "Derry, my hometown, is a very cultured and musical place; wherever you turn there's always music...That was especially true in my family... We’d just sit around the fire, sing, and drink tea".

Career
Carlin began her career at the age of 15 when she won the title role of 'The Rose' in BBC Talents 'Young Singers' competition in the opera The Little Prince, by Rachel Portman. It aired on BBC Two and PBS in America.

Carlin trained in vocal performance at Trinity Laban Conservatoire of Music and Dance in London. Once she graduated, she was offered a postgraduate scholarship in Musical Theatre by the Royal Academy of Music. She declined the scholarship when offered a deal with Decca Records. Carlin continued to train with Mary Hammond and Simon Lee.

Carlin performed for the President of Ireland, celebrated the Irish Anthem for the England-Ireland Rugby International to a TV audience of millions. She shared the stage with Snow Patrol and The Priests at the 2013 BBC TV Gala Concert ‘Sons and Daughters’ to mark Derry's year as City of Culture. She also recorded the City of Culture anthem ‘Let The River Run’ with Glee star Damian McGinty. Carly Simon was impressed by the song, saying "I just played it and cried my eyes out and I'm still crying. It's absolutely stunningly wonderful. Thank you for doing me proud." Simon later invited Carlin and McGinty to perform live with her in Los Angeles at an Oceana benefit concert presented by Hillary Clinton, Ted Danson and Harvey Weinstein. Simon subsequently released the single under her own label Iris Records/Walled City Records.

Carlin toured the UK and Ireland with American singer-songwriter Don McLean, including a sold out concert at the Royal Albert Hall. In early 2013, she made her debut with the National Symphony Orchestra in the National Concert Hall for RTÉ TV. She was the featured soprano on 'White Light' in the box office hit Alan Partridge: Alpha Papa with music by Ilan Eshkeri.

"A motto I’ve used throughout my career so far", she says, "is a quote from the award-winning poet Seamus Heaney: ‘Sing yourself to where the singing comes from.’ I think there's a lot to be said for that".

After finishing her degree, Carlin was signed to Decca Records and recorded her debut album, Songbook with the London Philharmonic Orchestra in Air Studios and British Grove Studios. It was mixed by Grammy award winning engineer Geoff Foster. Carlin describes the album as portraying the more 'vulnerable' side to her sound and a 'transition period in my life where I was finding myself- I guess I was growing up through this album. In every breath and in every note, there's a story...believe me'.

Celtic Woman
On 5 August 2013 the Celtic Woman website reported that Chloë Agnew would be taking a break from Celtic Woman to work on solo projects. On 23 August 2013 it reported Carlin would be taking Chloë's place. On 13 January 2021, Carlin announced that she was taking a break from the group to focus on other projects.

Personal
In September 2016, she married singer and dancer Ronan Scolard.

Discography
 Solo
 Songbook (2013)
 With Celtic Woman
Celtic Woman: Destiny (2015)
Celtic Woman: Voices of Angels (2016)
Celtic Woman: The Best of Christmas (2017)
Celtic Woman: Homecoming Live from Ireland (2018)
Celtic Woman: Ancient Land (2018)
Celtic Woman: The Magic of Christmas (2019)
Celtic Woman: Celebration 15 years of Music and Magic (2020)

References

External links
Mairéad Carlin biography

Celtic Woman members
Living people
Musicians from Derry (city)
21st-century women singers from Northern Ireland
Year of birth missing (living people)